Andreyanovsky is a rural locality (a khutor) in Bukanovskoye Rural Settlement, Kumylzhensky District, Volgograd Oblast, Russia. The population was 6 as of 2010.

Geography 
Andreyanovsky is located on Khopyorsko-Buzulukskaya Plain, 45 km southwest of Kumylzhenskaya (the district's administrative centre) by road. Belenky is the nearest rural locality.

References 

Rural localities in Kumylzhensky District